Silas Melson (born August 22, 1996) is an American professional basketball player for Petkim Spor of the Turkish Basketball Super League. He played college basketball for the Gonzaga Bulldogs, where he was named All-West Coast Conference Honorable Mention in 2018.

Early life and college career
Melson attended Jefferson High School in Portland, Oregon, where he averaged 24.2 points, 6.0 rebounds, 3.3 assists and 1.5 steals. He led the Democrats to a 26–1 record and a second consecutive Class 5A state championship. On March 21, 2014, Melson was named Oregon Gatorade Player of the Year.

Melson played college basketball at Gonzaga University, where he finished his senior year averaging 9.2 points per game while shooting 40.8% of his shots from the field.  On February 27, 2018, Melson was named All-WCC Honorable Mention.

Professional career

2018–19 season
On June 20, 2018, Melson started his professional career with Lavrio of the Greek Basket League. On November 11, 2018, Melson recorded a season-high 23 points, shooting 9-of-13 from the field in a 63–102 loss to Olympiacos.

On December 23, 2018, Melson signed a one-month contract with Hapoel Be'er Sheva of the Israeli Premier League as an injury cover for Semaj Christon. On January 28, 2019, Melson recorded 20 points, shooting 4-of-5 from three-point range, leading Be'er Sheva to an 87–74 win over Bnei Herzliya. On February 21, 2019, Melson parted ways with Be'er Sheva after appearing in eight games.

2019–20 season
On August 5, 2019, Melson signed a one-year deal with Polpharma Starogard of the Polish Basketball League. He averaged 20.8 points, 4.1 rebounds and 2.5 assists per game.

2020–21 season
On June 16, 2020, Melson signed with Limburg United of the Pro Basketball League. He averaged 16.8 points, 3.0 rebounds, 1.9 assists and 1.2 steals per game.

2021–22 season
On July 29, 2021, Melson signed with Kalev/Cramo of the Latvian–Estonian Basketball League.

2022–23 season
On June 13, 2022, he has signed with Petkim Spor of the Turkish Basketball Super League.

References

External links
 Gonzaga bio
 RealGM profile

1996 births
Living people
American expatriate basketball people in Belgium
American expatriate basketball people in Estonia
American expatriate basketball people in Finland
American expatriate basketball people in Greece
American expatriate basketball people in Israel
American men's basketball players
Basketball players from Portland, Oregon
BC Kalev/Cramo players
Gonzaga Bulldogs men's basketball players
Hapoel Be'er Sheva B.C. players
Jefferson High School (Portland, Oregon) alumni
Kouvot players
Lavrio B.C. players
Limburg United players
Petkim Spor players
Point guards
Shooting guards